Río Bueno (Spanish: "good river") may refer to:

Río Bueno, Chile
Bueno River, Chile
Rio Bueno, Jamaica, a port in the parish of Trelawny
Rio Bueno (Jamaica), a river